Barbara Nation ( – 19 December 2014), better known as Barbara Jones, was a Jamaican singer who had a UK hit single in 1981 with "Just When I Needed You Most".

Career
Born in Kingston and raised in Manchester, Jamaica, she began her career in 1971 with the single "Sad Movies". She had her greatest success in January 1981 with "Just When I Needed You Most", which reached number 31 on the UK Singles Chart.

She toured as backing singer with Jimmy Cliff in the late 1970s and early 1980s; In 1991, she became a devout Christian and  gave up secular music to concentrate on gospel music.

After becoming ill in London, she was diagnosed with leukaemia in February 2014. She returned to reggae with performances in Brazil with Lloyd Parks. Her health deteriorated and she died in Kingston's  University Hospital of the West Indies on 19 December 2014, from pneumonia contracted during chemotherapy treatments. She was 62 years old.

Jones was once described as "the Billie Holliday of reggae music".

Discography
Don't Stop Loving Me (1979), GG's
My Love: Just When I Needed You Most (1980), Rhino
Sings Hit Songs In Reggae Style (1983), Top Rank
You're Always On My Mind (1984), Dynamic
10 Million Sellers In Reggae (1985), Top Rank
Need to Belong (1985), EAD
Will It Last Forever, Hit
For Your Ears Only (1994), Jamaican Gold
The Two of Us, Park Height - Phillip James feat. Barbara Jones
Jesus Is Calling (2000), VP
Thank You Lord for Your Blessing (2005), Silver Lining
So Much to Thank Him For (2005), Silver Lining
Use Me Lord (2011), Nylahs Gospel Music

Compilations
Best of Barbara Jones (1976), Trojan
Sad Movies (1997), Charly
Just When I Needed You Most: The Best of Barbara Jones (2004), Trojan
Blue Side of Lonesome (2007), Jet Star/Zone Entertainment

References

1950s births
2014 deaths
Date of birth missing
Musicians from Kingston, Jamaica
20th-century Jamaican women singers
Jamaican reggae singers
Deaths from pneumonia in Jamaica
Deaths from leukemia
Deaths from cancer in Jamaica
21st-century Jamaican women singers